Events in the year 1975 in the Republic of India.

Sports
 India won the Men's Hockey World Cup first time. It was held in Kuala Lumpur, Malaysia

Incumbents
 President of India – Fakhruddin Ali Ahmed
 Prime Minister of India – Indira Gandhi
 Chief Justice of India – Ajit Nath Ray

Governors
 Andhra Pradesh – Khandubhai Kasanji Desai (until 25 January), S. Obul Reddy (starting 25 January)
 Assam – L. P. Singh 
 Bihar – Ramchandra Dhondiba Bhandare 
 Gujarat – Kambanthodath Kunhan Vishwanatham 
 Haryana – Birendra Narayan Chakraborty (until 27 March), Birendra Narayan Chakraborty (starting 27 March)
 Himachal Pradesh – S. Chakravarti
 Jammu and Kashmir – L. K. Jha 
 Karnataka – Mohanlal Sukhadia (until 10 January), Uma Shankar Dikshit (starting 10 January)
 Kerala – N. N. Wanchoo 
 Madhya Pradesh – Satya Narayan Sinha 
 Maharashtra – Ali Yavar Jung 
 Manipur – L.P. Singh 
 Meghalaya – L.P. Singh 
 Nagaland – L.P. Singh 
 Odisha – Akbar Ali Khan 
 Punjab – Mahendra Mohan Choudhry 
 Rajasthan – Sardar Jogendra Singh
 Sikkim –  Bipen Behari Lal (starting 18 May)
 Tamil Nadu – Kodardas Kalidas Shah 
 Tripura – L. P. Singh 
 Uttar Pradesh – Akbar Ali Khan 
 West Bengal – Anthony Lancelot Dias

Events
 National income - 852,124 million
 19 January – The 6.8  Kinnaur earthquake shook northern India with a maximum Mercalli intensity of IX (Violent). Forty-seven people were killed.
 19 March – Indira Gandhi became the first Prime Minister of India to testify in a court. She appeared before Allahabad High Court in State of Uttar Pradesh v. Raj Narain case.
 10 April - State Council (Sikkim) unanimously voted to abolish Monarchy of Chogyal and merge with India.
 14 April - 1975 Sikkimese monarchy referendum held and obtained 97.75%approval.
 19 April – The first Indian satellite, Aryabhata, goes into Earth's orbit.
 21 April - Farakka Barrage across Ganges commissioned in West Bengal.
 12 June – Justice Jagmohanlal Sinha declared PM Indira Gandhi's election to parliament from Rae Bareli (Lok Sabha constituency) in 1971 Indian general election null and void.
 25 June – A state of emergency is declared by Prime Minister Indira Gandhi during which the press is censored and 100,000 are jailed.
 27 December – The Chasnala mining disaster kills 375 people when an explosion in a coal mine causes catastrophic flooding.

Law
 25 April - Kerala Legislative Assembly passed the Kerala Scheduled Tribes (Restriction on Transfer of Lands and Restoration of Alienated Lands) Act, 1975, for restoring land rights to tribals.
 15 May – 35th amendment of the Constitution of India ratifies statehood for Sikkim and deposing of Chogyal monarchy.

Births

January to June
 
1 January
 Sonali Bendre, actress
 Kamaal Rashid Khan, actor and internet celebrity
2 January  Rupal Patel, actress
8 January  Harris Jayaraj, film composer.
31 January – Preity Zinta, actress.
17 March – Puneeth Rajkumar, actor. (d. 2021).
28 March – Akshaye Khanna, actor and son of Vinod Khanna.
17 May – Dinesh Nayak, field hockey player.
26 May – Abbas, actor.
4 June – Bhuvaneshwari, actress.
8 June – Shilpa Shetty, actress.
25 June – Manoj Kumar Pandey, Military personnel. (d. 1999).

July to December
6 July – Jeevan (Tamil actor)
12 July – D. Roopa, Police Service.
23 July – Suriya, actor.
9 August – Mahesh Babu, actor.
16 September – Pushkar Singh Dhami, Politician and 10th Chief Minister of Uttarakhand 
28 August – Eijaz Khan, actor.
28 August – Anuj Nayyar, Military officer. (d. 1999)
16 October – Rajeev Khandelwal, actor.
7 November  Venkat Prabhu, film director and actor.
11 November – Diwakar Pundir, actor.
19 November – Sushmita Sen, Miss Universe 1994, actress.
9 December – Priya Gill, actress.
14 December – Sukhbir Singh Gill, field hockey player.
15 December – Siddhaanth Vir Surryavanshi, actor (d. 2022)
21 December – Srijato, poet

Deaths
17 April – Sarvepalli Radhakrishnan, philosopher and statesman, first Vice President of India and second President of India (b. 1888).

See also 
 List of Bollywood films of 1975

References

 
India
Years of the 20th century in India